Pam is a feminine given name, often a diminutive form (hypocorism) of Pamela.

People
 Pam Arciero (born 1954), American puppeteer
 Pam Ayres (born 1947), British poet, comedian, songwriter and presenter
 Pam Barnes (television producer), Australian television producer
 Pamela Pam Bondi (born 1965), American attorney and politician, Attorney General of Florida
 Pamela Pam Bowers (born 1949), American college basketball head coach
 Pam Brady (born 1969), American writer and television producer
 Pam Burridge (born 1965), Australian surfer
 Pam Cameron (born 1971), politician in Northern Ireland
 Pamela Pam Casale (born 1963), American tennis player
 Pamela Pam Dawber (born 1951), American actress
 Pamela Pam Dreyer (born 1981), American ice hockey player
 Pamela Pam Ferris (born 1948), British actress
 Pamela Pam Grier (born 1949), American actress
 Pam Hallandal (born 1929), Australian artist
 Pam Lins, American artist
 Pam Long, American writer and executive producer
 Pam Marshall (born 1960), American sprinter
 Pamela Pam Peters (born 1942), Emeritus Professor of Linguistics at Macquarie University, Sydney, Australia
 Pam Muñoz Ryan (born 1951), American writer for children and young adults
 Pamela Pam Oliver (born 1962), American sportscaster
 Pamela Pam Patenaude (born 1961), American government official
 Pam Reynolds (1956–2010), American singer-songwriter who claimed to have had a near-death experience during surgery
 Pamela Pam Shriver (born 1961), American tennis player
 Pam Tillis (born 1957), American country music singer-songwriter and actress
 Pam Tshwete, South African politician
 Pam Warren (speaker) (born 1967), British author, activist and founder of the Paddington Survivor's Group
 Pamela Pam Warren (civil servant), American civil servant and former Oklahoma Secretary of Administration
 Pam the Funkstress (1966–2017), American DJ

Fictional characters
 Pam, a vampire from The Southern Vampire Mysteries/Sookie Stackhouse Series by Charlaine Harris, and the American television drama series True Blood
 Pamela Pam Beesly, on the American TV series The Office
 Pam Coker, on the British soap opera EastEnders
 Pamela Pam Ewing, on the American soap opera Dallas

English-language feminine given names
Hypocorisms